Edward Carroll Stone (born January 23, 1936) is an American space scientist, professor of physics at the California Institute of Technology, and former director of the NASA Jet Propulsion Laboratory (JPL).

Biography

Stone was born in Knoxville, Iowa. After receiving his undergraduate education at Iowa's Burlington Junior College in Iowa, Stone attended the University of Chicago where he earned his M.S. and Ph.D. degrees in physics. Stone's astrophysics career goes back to his first cosmic-ray experiments on Discoverer satellites in 1961.  He then joined the staff of Caltech as a research fellow, and became a full faculty member in 1967.

He was named professor of physics in 1976, and was chair of the Division of Physics, Mathematics, and Astronomy from 1983 to 1988. He has also served as director of the Caltech Space Radiation Laboratory, and as vice president for Astronomical Facilities. He is currently the Morrisroe Professor of Physics and the vice-chair of the Thirty Meter Telescope Board of Directors.

As project scientist for the unmanned Voyager spacecraft missions to the outer Solar System from 1972, and a major spokesman for the Voyager science team, he became especially well known to the public in the 1980s. He has since been principal investigator on nine NASA spacecraft missions and coinvestigator on five more.

He was the principal investigator for the Cosmic Ray System on the Voyager 1 and 2 spacecraft, an experiment to measure cosmic rays. He also appeared in The Farthest, a 2017 documentary on the Voyager program. Stone retired from project scientist of the Voyager missions in 2022 after holding the role for 50 years.

JPL director

Stone was the director of Jet Propulsion Laboratory in Pasadena, California from 1991 to 2001. During his tenure, the Mars Pathfinder and its Sojourner rover were successful. Other JPL missions in the period included Mars Global Surveyor, Deep Space 1, TOPEX/Poseidon, 
NASA Scatterometer (NSCAT) and the launches of Cassini, Stardust, and 2001 Mars Odyssey.

Awards and honors
 Member of the National Academy of Sciences
 Member of the American Philosophical Society
 Recipient of the 1991 National Medal of Science
 Recipient of the 1992 Magellanic Premium
 Recipient of the 1992 Golden Plate Award of the American Academy of Achievement
 Recipient of the 1999 Carl Sagan Memorial Award
 Recipient of the 2007 Philip J. Klass Award for Lifetime Achievement
 Recipient of the 2013 NASA Distinguished Public Service Medal
 Recipient of the 2014 Howard Hughes Memorial Award
 Recipient of the 2019 Shaw Prize in Astronomy
 Recipient of the 2022 Benjamin Franklin Medal
 Minor planet 5841 Stone discovered by Eleanor Helin is named after him.

References

External links
 Stone's web page
 Space Radiation Laboratory
 JPL Gallery for Ed Stone
 Profile in Discover magazine

1936 births
Living people
California Institute of Technology faculty
National Medal of Science laureates
Voyager program
Members of the United States National Academy of Sciences
People from Knoxville, Iowa
20th-century American physicists
21st-century  American physicists
Scientists from Iowa
University of Chicago alumni
Fellows of the American Physical Society
Members of the American Philosophical Society